Cross of the Seven Jewels is a 1987 Italian horror film directed, written and starring Marco Antonio Andolfi. Prior to directing the film, Andolfi worked in film in the amateur theatre and claims to have worked in developing stories for Lanciostory. He based the film on his work in theatre and comics and real life experiences. Among the cast includes Andolfi who is credited as Eddy Endolf and Annie Belle and adult film actress Zaira Zoccheddu.

After the film's release, Andolfi re-edited the film in 1995 and re-released it under the name Talisman. This version of the film included footage from documentaries and newsreels and footage from The Serpent and the Rainbow.

Plot

Production
Marco Antonio Andolfi  worked first at a sewing machine company as a technician while working in amateur theatre on the side. While attempting to work in film in the 1970s, he stated he worked writing plays and photonovels for Lanciostory magazine. The story and screenplay for the film were based on a real-life event that happened to Andolfi who stated that in Naples he had a bejeweled cross he was going to give to a woman in Naples, when two people in motorcycles came by and took it off his neck. Andolfi stated he retrieved the cross and combined this real-life story with stories from his plays and comics.

Andolf managed to get funding from the state due to Article 28 of the 1965 cinema law that allowed for state funding for films with cultural or artistic aspirations. Andolfi stars in the film under the name of Eddy Endolf, stating that this was done as "distributors would not even take me into consideration". Among the cast were pornographic film actor Zaira Zoccheddu and actress Annie Belle. Belle was suffering from alcohol abuse at the time and stated in a later interview that she did not remember anything about the film.

Release
Cross of the Seven Jewels was distributed theatrically in Italy on 30 April 1987 by Compagnia Distribuzione Internazionale. Andolfi assembled a re-edited version of the film in 1995 titled Talisman, with scenes taken from documentaries, newsreel footage and from the film The Serpent and the Rainbow.

Reception
Italian film critic and historian Roberto Curti described the film as having a reputation of being "one of the worst Italian movies ever made".

References

Footnotes

Sources

External links
 

Werewolf films
1987 horror films
1987 films
Italian horror films
1980s Italian films